{| class="infobox" style="width:22em; text-align:left; font-size:90%; vertical-align:middle; background:#eef;"
|+ <span style="font-size: 9pt">'Paradox (Isyana Sarasvati album) & another awards and nominations</span>
|- style="background:white;"
| colspan="3" style="text-align:center;" | 
|-
| 
| colspan="2" width=50  
|
|-
| 
| colspan="2" width=50  
|
|-
| 
| colspan="2" width=50  
|}Paradox'' is the second studio album by Isyana Sarasvati. Released on September 1, 2017, the main songs are "Anganku Anganmu", "Sekali Lagi" and "Terpesona". This album is only sold in all KFC outlets in Indonesia.

 Theme and background 
Unlike the first album Explore!, the contents of the lyrics are fictional stories and based stories on friends, while on Paradox almost all of the lyrics are related to her personal stories. Most of the song themes of the song and the lyrics strongly represent her feelings and personality.

All songs in Paradox were originally written by Isyana Sarasvati who recognized this album as the album that best reflects her personal life. With the help of several Swedish producers, Isyana also had the chance to write and record her songs in Sweden since February 2017.

The theme of this album, namely "The Voice of Paradox" is seen in lyrics, rhythm, and paradoxical tones. Isyana interprets the paradox like human life today, where life has complicated elements, globally and locally, socially and personally. We cannot really understand what really happened. Isyana explained, she read a paradoxical life with a paradoxical personality. Introversion as well as extroversion, pop and classical, in mixed English in English that produce works that build a balance of various contradictions. Through the lyrics, this album tells a lot about emotions that represent Isyana's personal experiences and characters while she continues to answer the tastes of music lovers from various genres.

 Track listing Notes'''
  sign as co-producer.

Awards

Anugerah Musik Indonesia

Anugerah Planet Muzik

Cornetto Pop Awards

Dahsyatnya Awards

Indonesian Choice Awards

Indonesian Film Festival

JawaPos.com Readers Choice Awards

LINE Indonesia Awards

Maya Awards

Mnet Asian Music Awards

MTV Europe Music Awards

OZ Radio Bandung FM Awards

SCTV Music Awards

Other Awards

References

External links 
 Detail album on iTunes

2017 albums
Isyana Sarasvati albums